Brevity is a single-panel newspaper comic strip created by Guy Endore-Kaiser and Rodd Perry, and currently drawn by Dan Thompson.

Publication history 
Brevity originally began on Comics Sherpa (a site which helps beginning comic strips make their work public over the web). Endore-Kaiser cited Gary Larson's The Far Side as an inspiration. The strip was originally intended to be called Cow Tools, in homage to a notorious Far Side cartoon, but the authors were forced to change it after receiving a cease-and-desist letter from lawyers representing Larson. The strip debuted with United Feature Syndicate in 55 newspapers on January 3, 2005. Today, Brevity is published in over 130 newspapers in the US and Canada. There are currently four published collections and one treasury.

In the past few years GoComics.com has allowed visitors to submit comments on each strip.

Books 
There are four collections and one treasury published by Andrews McMeel Publishing.

References

External links 

 

Gag cartoon comics
Gag-a-day comics
2005 comics debuts